El Morro del Tulcán (lit. Tulcán Hill) is an Indigenous pyramid in Popayán, Colombia.  Research suggests that the people buried there came from the top social classes.

On this pyramid a statue dedicated to the Conquistador Sebastián de Belalcázar existed from 1937 to 2020.

El Morro del Tulcán is the main archaeological site of Popayán.

References

External links
 Introduction 

Pyramids in South America
Burial monuments and structures
Buildings and structures in Cauca Department
Archaeological sites in Colombia